Croatia–Ukraine relations are foreign relations between Croatia and Ukraine. The countries established diplomatic relations on 18 February 1992. Croatia has an embassy in Kyiv and an honorary consulate in Donetsk. Ukraine has an embassy in Zagreb and honorary consulates in Malinska and Split.
Croatia supports Ukraine's European Union and NATO membership.

History 
Before 1991, both Croatia and Ukraine were part of multinational socialist states, SFR Yugoslavia and Soviet Union. Croatia declared independence from Yugoslavia on 25 June 1991, but considering a three-month moratorium on the decision urged by the European Community, it put into effect on 8 October 1991. Ukraine proclaimed independence from the Soviet Union on 24 August 1991 and recognized Croatia on 11 December 1991 as the first United Nations member state which did it. Diplomatic relations between two countries were established on 18 February 1992.

Diaspora

Ukrainians in Croatia
As of the 2011 Croatian census, there were 1,878 Ukrainians and 1,936 Rusyns living in Croatia. Ukrainians and Rusyns of Croatia have opened two main cultural and educational organizations in Slavonski Brod and Vukovar, which later expanded into ten smaller communities each, presently operating in various Croatian cities including Zagreb and Rijeka. Croatia strives to meet the needs of the minorities and promote friendly ties between the two nations, having a central library in Zagreb since 1995, a cathedra for Ukrainian language and literature at the University of Zagreb since 2001, and classes provided in the Ukrainian language. Various dates of importance to Ukrainian history, holidays and manifestations are commemorated every year.

Croats in Ukraine
As of the 2001 Ukrainian census, there were 126 Croats living in Ukraine.

See also 
 Foreign relations of Croatia
 Foreign relations of Ukraine 
 Croatian War of Independence
 War in eastern Ukraine
 Soviet Union–Yugoslavia relations

References

External links
 Embassy of Croatia in Ukraine 
 Embassy of Ukraine in Croatia 

 
Ukraine
Bilateral relations of Ukraine